Pergola is the second studio album by Johan, released in 2001, five years after their debut album Johan. Both albums were released on the record label Excelsior Recordings. The album was well received by the press. On 6 May 2002, the album was released with a different cover in (Germany).

Track listing 
 "Tumble and Fall"
 "Pergola"
 "I Mean I Guess"
 "Tomorrow"
 "Day is Done"
 "I Feel Fine"
 "Paper Planes" 
 "Save Game"
 "How Does It Feel"
 "Why_CP"
 "Time and Time Again"
 "Here"

Personnel
Jacco de Greeuw – lead singer, guitar, keyboard, 
Wim Kwakman – drums
David Corel – bass, backing vocals
Diederik Nomden – guitar, keyboard, backing vocals
Diets Dijkstra – guitar
Maarten Kooijman – guitar, backing vocals

Johan (band) albums
2006 albums